A Very Still Movement is an EP by British rock band Oceansize, released in August 2001 on the record label Soviet Union.  The tracks "Catalyst" and "Women Who Have Men Who Love Drugs" were re-recorded for the band's debut Effloresce.  The EP was produced and mixed by Sel Balamir, singer and guitarist of Amplifier.  Balamir is also featured in the last track, "Sizeofanocean".

Track listing 
 "Catalyst" – 6:51
 "A Very Still Movement" – 3:26
 "Women Who Love Men Who Love Drugs" – 9:22
 "Sizeofanocean" – 5:19

Personnel 
 Mike Vennart – guitar, vocals
 Steve Durose – guitar, backing vocals
 Gambler – guitar, keyboards
 Jon Ellis – bass
 Mark Heron – drums
 Sel Balamir – additional guitar and backing vocals on "Sizeofanocean"

2001 EPs
Oceansize albums